Hybomitra micans is a species of horse flies in the family Tabanidae.

Distribution
Europe.

References

Tabanidae
Insects described in 1804
Diptera of Europe
Taxa named by Johann Wilhelm Meigen